Kate Jessica Kim Lee Foo Kune (born 29 March 1993) is a badminton player from Mauritius. She began playing badminton in Mauritius at age six. Her first major tournament participation was 2013 BWF World Championships in China, where she lost in the first round of women's singles to Sarah Walker of England. Foo Kune represented her country at the 2016 Summer Olympics in Rio de Janeiro, Brazil. She was the flag bearer for Mauritius during the Parade of Nations.

As a junior player, she won the Under-15 and Under-19 African tournaments. She was awarded the Sportswoman of the year in 2015 in Mauritius.  In doubles, she partnered with Yeldy Marie Louison, while in mixed doubles, she partnered with Julien Paul. Her career-best ranking remains 63 as of 2016 and her best performance remains the gold at 2015 African games.

Personal life 
Kate Foo Kune is the second child of Jacques and Cathy Foo Kune (née Ng), both leading mixed doubles badminton players who several championships, such as the 1985 Indian Ocean Games. The pair were married in 1990 and had two children. Her sister, Karen Foo Kune, is also a professional badminton player and competed at the 2008 Summer Olympics.

Foo Kune pursued her bachelor's degree in Sports Management while at France.

The sisters were paired and played doubles in 2010 Commonwealth Games in New Delhi. She is married to Czech badminton player Milan Ludik since August 2020.

Professional life 
Foo Kune started playing badminton at the age of six and turned professional by twelve. She first participated in a junior competition at age 12 in 2005. She had her international debut Thomas and Uber Cup Qualification for Africa in 2010 held at Uganda. She was named Sportswoman of the Year in 2015 in Mauritius. In doubles, she partnered with Yeldy Marie Louison, while in mixed doubles, she partnered with Julien Paul. During the early part of her career, she paired with her sister Karen Foo Kune. During her first outing in the African Badminton Cup of Nations, she finished second, but a few weeks later, she won the Mauritius International Series. She went on to win the Under-15 and Under-19 African tournaments.

In September 2013, it was reported that she was one of the 14 players selected for the Road to Rio Program, a program that aimed to help African badminton players compete at the 2016 Summer Olympics.

As of 2016, she lived in Paris, France, and joined Issy-Les-Moulineaux Badminton Club. Prior to this, she trained for four months in Malaysia and Leeds, England.

Foo Kune was part of the Mauritius badminton squad which won the title at the 2016 Africa Continental Team Badminton Championships in February 2016, which also confirms the participation of Mauritius in 2016 Uber Cup. In June 2016, Foo Kune won the 2016 European Badminton Club Championships with her club despite losing in the final to Beatriz Corrales. She was the flagbearer for Mauritius during the Parade of Nations. She won her first match against Wendy Chen Hsuan-Yu of Australia, but was defeated by Porntip Buranaprasertsuk of Thailand and failed to qualify for the next round.

In June 2019, Foo Kune was tested positive for doping during the 2019 African Badminton Championships and in November 2019, she was retrospectively disqualified from the championship, thus becoming the first ever badminton player from Mauritius to be suspended for doping. In December 2020, Foo Kune was banned for two years for the positive test, after a failed appeal to the Court of Arbitration for Sport. As a result, Foo Kune cannot compete at the delayed 2020 Summer Olympics in 2021.

Achievements

All African Games 
Women's singles

Women's doubles

African Championships 
Women's singles

In November 2019, Badminton World Federation released a statement regarding doping test failure of Kate Foo Kune in this championships and decided to disqualify her result.

Women's doubles

Mixed doubles

BWF International Challenge/Series (9 titles, 11 runners-up) 
Women's singles

Women's doubles

Mixed doubles

  BWF International Challenge tournament
  BWF International Series tournament
  BWF Future Series tournament

Career overview 

 ''* Statistics were last updated on 18 February 2020.

References

External links
 
 Africa Badminton

1993 births
Living people
People from Moka District
Mauritian people of Chinese descent
Mauritian female badminton players
Badminton players at the 2016 Summer Olympics
Badminton players at the 2010 Summer Youth Olympics
Olympic badminton players of Mauritius
Badminton players at the 2010 Commonwealth Games
Badminton players at the 2014 Commonwealth Games
Badminton players at the 2018 Commonwealth Games
Commonwealth Games competitors for Mauritius
Competitors at the 2007 All-Africa Games
Competitors at the 2015 African Games
African Games gold medalists for Mauritius
African Games silver medalists for Mauritius
African Games medalists in badminton
Mauritian sportspeople in doping cases
Doping cases in badminton